Country Church Time is the sixth studio album released by George Jones on January 20, 1959. The LP includes multiple early gospel recordings by Jones on Starday.

The album was released on January 20, 1959, and recorded from 1956-1958, listing Jones' first gospel recordings. The album, however, wasn't received well, and did not chart, due in large part to the lackluster sound of Starday and Mercury Records during the 1950s. The album was also Jones' debut album as a Mercury artist.

Background
Jones's fondness for gospel music is well documented.  In the 1989 documentary Same Ole Me, Jones recalls that he learned how to play the guitar at the church where his mother Clara, a devout woman, played piano.  The church was run by Brother Burl Stephen (with whom Jones would credit as co-writer of several songs on Country Church Time) and Sister Annie, who George remembered "taught me my first chords on the guitar, like C, G, and D and things like that, and I started hangin' out over there more often.  She'd get her guitar and we'd pick and sing together...We used to do all the really old gospel songs."   Jones's love of gospel music actually predated his exposure to country music, which he would not hear until his family acquired their first radio.

Recording and composition
Jones recorded the oldest selections included on the 1959 LP in August 1956. The songs "Boat of Life" and "Taggin' Along" were cut while Jones was still with Starday. Jones wrote several of the songs with Burl Stephens, composing melodies to Stephen's poems.  Both tracks were included on his debut album as well. His first recordings of 1957 were cut in January at the Gold Star Recording Studio in Houston (Jones was still with Starday).  It was during this time that Jones also switched to Mercury, recording his first Nashville songs in the Bradley Film and Recording Studio on 16th Ave. South. In September 1957, Jones recorded two songs titled; "Wandering Soul" and "If You Want to Wear a Crown."  "Wandering Soul" was co-written with Bill Dudley, and If You Want to Wear a Crown was another lonesome-pen by Jones.
April 21, September 1958 Recordings
Jones gathered at the studio again on April 21, 1958 to record a series of southern hymns that he picked up and wrote. The first recording was "Good Ole Bible," which was co-wrote with Burl Stephens. "We'll Understand It (Farther Along)" was recorded next, followed by "Will the Circle Be Unbroken?"  After recording "Life to Go" (a song that became a #2 for Stonewall Jackson later that year), he cut "Jesus Wants Me" and "My Lord Has Called Me," all three written by Jones alone.

Reception

Richie Unterberger of AllMusic writes that "if the lyrical scope might be more limited than his usual early efforts, sonically they're well in line with his approach as he started to reach his honky tonk prime, and anyone who likes late-'50s Jones should enjoy the plaintive performances here."  Amazon.com writes of the album: "Poignant church going gems perfect for Sunday morning worship plus just as many tunes for hungover reminiscing of what could have, would have or might have been. From early morning pulpit prayer to late night whiskey-soaked tales of regret, a fine collection of Jones at his most melancholy.  All this from a man who rode his lawnmower to the bar when his wife hid his car keys. Genius! Righteous."

In the essay that accompanies the 1994 Mercury retrospective Cup of Loneliness: The Mercury Years, country music historian Colin Escott marvels at the "frightening intensity" of "Cup of Loneliness" and "Take the Devil Out of Me," stating, "It's impossible not to believe that George was seeing demons and wizards when he wrote these."

Track listing

References

External links
 George Jones' Official Website
 Record Label

1959 albums
George Jones albums
Albums produced by Pappy Daily
Mercury Records albums
Southern gospel albums